SIS is an acronym that stands for Software Installation Script, the standard software installation package format for Symbian OS. SIS files are an archive, containing installation instructions, the application file (usually an .APP or .EXE file), and its dependencies. By convention .sisx denotes a signed file.

There are different ways how a SIS file can be created. The basic approach is to create a package definition file (.pkg) that contains information about the package like the vendor, package name and what files to include in the package. Then use the makesis and signsis utilities that processes the .pkg file and creates the actual SIS file. Other alternatives are to use the Carbide.c++ IDE that automatically builds the SIS file as part of the build process or to graphically define and create the installation package using PackageForge.
The Windows utility SISContents is able to convert various file formats.

See also
 .JAR (file format), Java installation files for mobile devices
 MBM (file format)
 Symbian OS
 S60 platform
 S90 platform

References

External links
 
 
 Symbian developer website s60_3_0_how_to_sign_sis_files_1_4.pdf

Archive formats
Symbian OS